B-type asteroids are a relatively uncommon type of carbonaceous asteroid, falling into the wider C-group; the 'B' indicates these objects are spectrally blue. In the asteroid population, B-class objects can be found in the outer asteroid belt, and also dominate the high-inclination Pallas family which includes the third-largest asteroid 2 Pallas. They are thought to be primitive, volatile-rich remnants from the early Solar System. There are 65 known B-type asteroids in the SMASS classification, and 9 in the Tholen classification as of March 2015.

Characteristics
Generally similar to the C-type objects, but differing in that the ultraviolet absorption below 0.5 μm is small or absent, and the spectrum is rather slightly bluish than reddish. The albedo also tends to be greater than in the generally very dark C type. Spectroscopy of B-class objects suggests major surface constituents of anhydrous silicates, hydrated clay minerals, organic polymers, magnetite, and sulfides. The closest matches to B-class asteroids have been obtained on carbonaceous chondrite meteorites that have been gently heated in the laboratory.

The majority of asteroids that have been observed to display cometary-like activity are B-types. Some of these objects display indications of aqueous alteration in the past, and they may have incorporated significant amounts of water ice.

Well studied B-type asteroids 

Asteroid 101955 Bennu is a B-type asteroid which is the target of the OSIRIS-REx mission. The mission seeks to characterize the asteroid by mapping the surface, studying the Yarkovsky effect, and retrieving a sample of the asteroid to return in 2023. The spacecraft was launched in 2016 and has been at Bennu since December 2018.

Other B-type asteroids include:

 2 Pallas
 24 Themis
 47 Aglaja
 59 Elpis
 85 Io
 88 Thisbe
 142 Polana
 213 Lilaea
 241 Germania
 282 Clorinde
 335 Roberta
 372 Palma
 383 Janina
 431 Nephele
 531 Zerlina
 541 Deborah
 555 Norma
 560 Delila
 702 Alauda
 704 Interamnia
 767 Bondia
 895 Helio
 1021 Flammario
 1331 Solvejg
 1474 Beira
 1484 Postrema
 1539 Borrelly
 1655 Comas Sola
 1705 Tapio
 1724 Vladimir
 2382 Nonie
 2446 Lunacharsky
 2527 Gregory
 2629 Rudra
 2659 Millis
 2708 Burns
 2772 Dugan
 2809 Vernadskij
 2816 Pien
 2973 Paola
 3000 Leonardo
 3074 Popov
 3200 Phaethon
 3566 Levitan
 3579 Rockholt
 3581 Alvarez
 3627 Sayers
 3647 Dermott
 4124 Herriot
 4396 Gressmann
 4686 Maisica
 4997 Ksana
 5079 Brubeck
 5102 Benfranklin
 5133 Phillipadams
 5222 Ioffe
 5234 Sechenov
 5330 Senrikyu
 5344 Ryabov
 (5690) 1992 EU
 6500 Kodaira
 (7753) 1988 XB
 
 (65679) 1989 UQ

See also 
 Asteroid spectral types

References 
 

Asteroid spectral classes